Gianluca de Lorenzi (born February 21, 1972 in Ravenna) is an Italian auto racing driver and team owner.

Career
After previously competing in karting, de Lorenzi began competing in the Italian Formula Three Championship in 1991. He moved to touring cars in 1996, competing in the Italian Super Touring Championship.

de Lorenzi raced for the works Alfa Romeo team, Alfa Team Nordauto in the European Super Touring Championship in 2000, finishing the season in seventh place. In 2001, he formed his own team, GDL Racing to compete in the championship, finishing seventh again as a driver for the team.

He finished runner-up to Salvatore Tavano in the Italian Super Touring Championship in 2003 with GDL Racing, and finished third in 2004. In 2005 the Italian championship was part of the new World Touring Car Championship for three rounds, as de Lorenzi finished runner-up once again in the Italian series, this time beaten by Alex Zanardi.

After concentrating on team management in 2006, de Lorenzi returned to the cockpit in 2007, finishing as runner-up in the Porsche Carrera Cup Italy.

Racing record

Complete World Touring Car Championship results
(key) (Races in bold indicate pole position) (Races in italics indicate fastest lap)

NASCAR
(key) (Bold – Pole position awarded by qualifying time. Italics – Pole position earned by points standings or practice time. * – Most laps led.)

Whelen Euro Series - Elite 1

References

External links
Career statistics at Driver Database

Living people
1972 births
Sportspeople from Ravenna
Italian racing drivers
Italian Formula Three Championship drivers
World Touring Car Championship drivers
Superstars Series drivers
Blancpain Endurance Series drivers
International GT Open drivers
European Touring Car Championship drivers
24 Hours of Spa drivers
Sports car racing team owners
24H Series drivers
BMW M drivers
AF Corse drivers